The Super Globe is a handball competition contested between the champion clubs from continental confederations.

The first Women's Super Globe was played in China.

Summary

Records and statistics

By club

By country

Participation details

References

 
International club handball competitions
Super Globe
Multi-national professional sports leagues
Recurring sporting events established in 2019